State elections in 2021 are held in Malacca and Sarawak. States in Malaysia are allow to dissolve separately from the federal level. In Malacca, the state legislature was dissolved on 5 October 2021 after four ADUN withdrew support of the current state government at that time. The election took place on 20 November 2021 which resulted in Barisan Nasional to win by a landslide and taking back the state from Pakatan Harapan (who won them in 2018).

Meanwhile in Sarawak, the assembly had automatically dissolve on 7 Jun 2021 but it was suspended as an emergency was declare. However on 3 November 2021, the state legislature was dissolve as the Agong lifted the emergency. On 24 November 2021, the Election Commission announces that the election will take place on 18 December 2021.

Malacca

The election was held on 20 November 2021 where Barisan Nasional won 2/3 majority in the state legisture.

Sarawak

The election was held on 18 December 2021.

References

2021 elections in Malaysia
2021